The 1960 United States presidential election in Tennessee took place on November 8, 1960, as part of the 1960 United States presidential election. Tennessee voters chose 11 representatives, or electors, to the Electoral College, who voted for president and vice president.

Tennessee was won by incumbent Vice President Richard Nixon (R–California), running with United States Ambassador to the United Nations Henry Cabot Lodge, Jr., with 52.92% of the popular vote, against Senator John F. Kennedy (D–Massachusetts), running with Senator Lyndon B. Johnson, with 45.77% of the popular vote. Kennedy became the first Democrat to win without Tennessee since the creation of the Republican Party, and the only one until Barack Obama in 2008.

Results

Results by county

References

Tennessee
1960
1960 Tennessee elections